Kjofossen Power Station is a hydroelectric power plant at Vestland built during World War II. Part of its power is used as railway traction current, i.e. single-phase electric power at 16 2/3 hertz, fed directly into the overhead wire of the railway to Bergen. The only other power station in Norway to produce traction current is Hakavik Power Station.

See also

 Hakavik Power Station

External links 
 https://web.archive.org/web/20131110175836/http://www.ee.kth.se/php/modules/publications/reports/2010/IR-EE-ES_2010_006.pdf
 https://archive.today/20130418173955/http://de.globio.travel/details/Electric-power-supply-system-of-railways-in-Norway/4dc05210b5d2d6e78f020e65

Aurland
Buildings and structures in Vestland
Hydroelectric power stations in Norway